The Basilica of Sant'Abbondio is a Romanesque-style 11th-century Catholic basilica church located in Como, region of Lombardy, Italy.

Description
The current edifice rises over a pre-existing 5th century Palaeo-Christian church entitled to Sts. Peter and Paul, built by order of St. Amantius of Como, third bishop of the city. Erected c. 1 km outside the city's walls, it was intended to house several relics of the two saints which Amantius had brought from Rome.

The basilica acted as bishop's seat until 1007. Six years later bishop Alberic moved the seat within the walls. The basilica was then entrusted to the Benedictines who, between 1050 and 1095, rebuilt it in Romanesque style. The new edifice was dedicated to Amantius' successor, Abundius. The structures of the Palaeo-Christian church, discovered in 1863 during a restoration, are still marked by black and pale marble stones in the pavement.

The new basilica had a nave and four aisles. It was consecrated by pope Urban II on June 3, 1095.

The church has two notable bell towers rising at the end of the external aisles, in the middle of the nave. The sober façade, once preceded by a portico, has seven windows and a portal. Notable is the external decoration of the choir's windows. There are also Romanesque bas-reliefs and, in the apse, a notable cycle of mid-14th-century frescoes. Under the high altar are the Abundius' relics.

The medieval monastery annexed to the church, recently restored, acts as the seat of the local faculty of jurisprudence.

References

External links
Page at Arte nel Medioevo 

Abbondio
Former cathedrals in Italy
11th-century Roman Catholic church buildings in Italy
Churches completed in 1095
Romanesque architecture in Lombardy
Churches in the province of Como